The 1943 RAF Hudson crash was an aerial accident that killed two people. The aircraft crashed in a forced landing attempt near RAF St Eval, Cornwall, England, following engine failure.

Aircraft
FH168 was a Lockheed Hudson IIIA (a lend-lease A-29-LO serial no 41-36969 and c/n 414-6458), operated by No. 38 Wing RAF, based at RAF Netheravon. The aircraft was unable to maintain height due to one engine failing, and the load it was carrying.

Casualties
Air Commodore Sir Nigel Norman, on his way to the Middle East for an Airborne Forces Planning Conference, died as a result of the crash. The only other airman killed in the crash was Pilot Officer (Obs) Arthur Rotenberg, who is buried in St Columb Major Cemetery.

Rescue
The surviving crew and passengers were rescued by two nearby farm workers – William Richards and Eddie Thomas – and a nearby member of the Royal Observer Corps, George Gregory. In 1945, Gregory was awarded the British Empire Medal for his brave actions during the rescue of the crew.

References

Further reading
 

Aviation accidents and incidents in 1943
Aviation accidents and incidents in England
Accidents and incidents involving Royal Air Force aircraft
1943 in England
1943 disasters in the United Kingdom